Kimo Armitage is a poet, children's book author, playwright and videographer from Hale'iwa, O'ahu, where his maternal grandparents raised him. Kimo apprenticed with poet and novelist Albert Wendt. He is an assistant professor at Kamakakuokalani Center for Hawaiian Studies at the University of Hawaii at Manoa. He won the 2016 Maureen Egan Writers Exchange Award for Poetry. His first novel, The Healer, was published in 2016.

Works
 The Healer – 2016

References 

Living people
American children's writers
Year of birth missing (living people)